David Anthony Picken (born Hednesford, Staffordshire, 5 June 1963) is a British Anglican priest. Since 2020, he has served as the Archdeacon of Lancaster; he previously served as Archdeacon of Newark since 2012.

Picken was educated at Kingsmead School, Hednesford and the University of London. He was firstly a teacher of Religious Studies; then ordained deacon in 1990, and priest in 1991. After a curacy in Worth, West Sussex he was Team Vicar and Hospital Chaplain in Wordsley then Team Rector of   High Wycombe

References

1963 births
Living people
Alumni of the University of London
Archdeacons of Newark
Archdeacons of Lancaster
People educated at Kingsmead School, Hednesford
People from Hednesford
Schoolteachers from Staffordshire